Toulgoetinaclia is a genus of moths in the subfamily Arctiinae. It contains the single species Toulgoetinaclia obliquipuncta, which is found in Madagascar.

References

Natural History Museum Lepidoptera generic names catalog

Arctiinae